Harting is a German surname from the states Lower Saxony and Nordrhein-Westfalen.

Harting is a parish in the English county of Sussex. 

Harting may also refer to:

 Harting (UK electoral ward), of Chichester District, West Sussex, England

Surname
 Hans Harting (1926—2004), Dutch athlete
 J. Harting, Indonesian football defender who played for the Dutch East Indies
 James Edmund Harting, English ornithologist
 Jumbo Harting (1865—1947), American baseball player
 Pieter Harting (1812—85), Dutch biologist
 Robert Harting (born 1984), German discus thrower

See also
 Mayr-Harting
 Jeff Hartings (born 1972), American college and professional football player